An immersion blender, also known as a stick blender, mini blender, hand blender, or wand blender, is a kitchen blade grinder used to blend ingredients or purée food in the container in which they are being prepared. He called the new appliance "bamix", a portmanteau of the French "battre et mixer" (beat and mix). Larger immersion blenders for commercial use are sometimes nicknamed boat motors (popularized by Emeril Lagasse and Alton Brown). Uses include puréeing soups and emulsifying sauces.

An immersion blender comprises an electric motor driving rotating cutting blades at the end of a shaft which can be immersed in the food being blended, inside a housing which can be held by hand. The shaft with blades is often detachable to facilitate cleaning, and there may be multiple different attachments available. Some blenders can be used in a pan while on the stove. Immersion blenders are distinguished from worktop blenders and food processors that require food to be placed in a special vessel for processing, and from hand mixers, which mix but do not chop.

Home models are available in corded or cordless versions. Motor power rating ranges from about 120 W to over 600 W for a heavy-duty model. Domestic models may be supplied with a goblet or other accessories.

References

General references
"The spin on sticks," by Janice Matsumoto. Restaurants & Institutions, March 1, 2000.Vol.110, Issue 6, page 95.
"A Whirling Dervish That Dips Right Into Your Pot," by Amanda Hesser. New York Times,  August 19, 1998, page F.3.

External links

Food preparation appliances
20th-century inventions
Swiss inventions